Kuki Station is the name of two train stations in Japan.

 Kuki Station (Mie) - (九鬼駅) in Owase, Mie Prefecture
 Kuki Station (Saitama) - (久喜駅) in Kuki, Saitama Prefecture